Boonlai Sor.Thanikul (born: November 11, 1970 in Chachoengsao Province, Thailand) is a retired Thai Muay Thai fighter. Former multiple weights Lumpinee Stadium champion during the golden era of muay thai.

Career
Boonlai started Muay Thai along his twin brother Boonlong at the age of 10. Training at first with their father at home and later at a small camp in their native Chachoengsao Province.
At 13 Boonlai and his brother went to Bangkok and stayed at the Sor.Ploenchit gym for over two years, Boonlai was fighting under the name Wangyu Sor.Ploenchit during that time. In 1986 they were sold to the Sor.Thanikul gym to clear a debt and made the rest of their career fighting out of there.

One of the best technician of his era, at the peak of his career Boonlay received purses as high as 200.000 baht. He beat many top fighters of his era such as Karuhat Sor.Supawan, Langsuan Panyuthaphum, Oley Kiatoneway,
Namkabuan Nongkeepahuyuth, Jongsanan Fairtex, Wangchannoi Sor Palangchai, Jaroensap Kiatbanchong, and Somrak Khamsing.
After his retirement Boonlay became a trainer in various camps in Bangkok before opening his own gym called Sor.Korpilap.

Titles & honour
Lumpinee Stadium
 1990 Lumpinee Stadium 115 lbs Champion (defended once)
 1992 Lumpinee Stadium 122 lbs Champion (defended once)

Fight record

|- style="background:#fbb;"
| 1995- || Loss||align=left| Karuhat Sor.Supawan || ||  Chachoengsao, Thailand  || Decision || 5 || 3:00
|-
! style=background:white colspan=9 |
|-  style="background:#fbb;"
| 1994-09-28|| Loss||align=left| Silapathai Jockygym || Rajadamnern Stadium || Bangkok, Thailand || KO (High kick + punches)|| 2 ||
|-  style="background:#cfc;"
| 1994-08-08|| Win||align=left| Lamnamoon Sor.Sumalee || Rajadamnern Stadium || Bangkok, Thailand || KO (Punches)|| 3 ||
|-  style="background:#fbb;"
| 1994-05-27 || Loss ||align=left| Wangchannoi Sor Palangchai  || Lumpinee Stadium ||  Bangkok, Thailand  || Decision || 5 || 3:00
|-  style="background:#cfc;"
| 1994-04-29|| Win||align=left| Chatchai Paiseetong || Lumpinee Stadium || Bangkok, Thailand || Decision || 5 || 3:00
|-  style="background:#cfc;"
| 1994-03-25|| Win||align=left| Lamnamoon Sor.Sumalee || Lumpinee Stadium || Bangkok, Thailand || KO (Uppercut + left hook)|| 2 ||
|-  style="background:#cfc;"
| 1994- || Win ||align=left| Oley Kiatoneway || ||  Thailand || Decision || 5 || 3:00
|-  style="background:#cfc;"
| 1994-01-07|| Win||align=left| Pompetch Naratreekul || Lumpinee Stadium || Bangkok, Thailand || Decision || 5 || 3:00
|- style="background:#fbb;"
| 1993-10-22 || Loss ||align=left| Rittichai Lookchaomaesaithong || Lumpinee Stadium ||  Bangkok, Thailand  || KO (Right high kick) || 2 ||
|- style="background:#fbb;"
| 1993-08-31 || Loss ||align=left| Chatchai Paiseetong || Lumpinee Stadium ||  Bangkok, Thailand  || Decision || 5 || 3:00
|-
! style=background:white colspan=9 |

|- style="background:#fbb;"
| 1993-08-06 || Loss||align=left| Namkabuan Nongkeepahuyuth || Lumpinee Stadium || Bangkok, Thailand  || Decision || 5 || 3:00

|-  style="background:#fbb;"
| 1993-07-11 || Loss||align=left| Oley Kiatoneway || OneSongchai || Nakhon Sawan, Thailand || Decision || 5 || 3:00
|- style="background:#cfc;"
| 1993-05-07 || Win||align=left| Karuhat Sor.Supawan || Lumpinee Stadium ||  Bangkok, Thailand  || Decision || 5 || 3:00
|-  style="background:#cfc;"
| 1993-04-06|| Win||align=left| Jaroensap Kiatbanchong || Lumpinee Stadium || Bangkok, Thailand || Decision || 5 || 3:00
|-  style="background:#c5d2ea;"
| 1993-02-15|| Draw||align=left| Superlek Sorn E-Sarn || Rajadamnern Stadium || Bangkok, Thailand || Decision || 5 || 3:00
|-  style="background:#cfc;"
| 1992-12-30|| Win ||align=left| Chamuekpet Hapalang  || Rajadamnern Stadium || Bangkok, Thailand || Decision || 5 || 3:00
|- style="background:#fbb;"
| 1992-11-20|| Loss ||align=left| Namkabuan Nongkeepahuyuth || Lumpinee Stadium || Bangkok, Thailand  || Decision || 5 || 3:00
|-  style="background:#cfc;"
| 1992-10-13|| Win||align=left| Oley Kiatoneway || OneSongchai, Lumpinee Stadium || Bangkok, Thailand || Decision || 5 || 3:00  
|-
! style=background:white colspan=9 |
|- style="background:#fbb;"
| 1992-09-11 ||Loss||align=left| Nuathoranee Thongracha || Lumpinee Stadium ||  Bangkok, Thailand  || Decision || 5 || 3:00
|- style="background:#cfc;"
| 1992-07-21 ||Win||align=left| Nungubon Sitlerchai || Lumpinee Stadium ||  Bangkok, Thailand  || Decision || 5 || 3:00
|- style="background:#cfc;"
| 1992-06-30 ||Win||align=left| Oley Kiatoneway || Lumpinee Stadium ||  Bangkok, Thailand  || Decision || 5 || 3:00
|-  style="background:#cfc;"
| 1992-05-29|| Win ||align=left| Jongsanan Fairtex || Lumpinee Stadium || Bangkok, Thailand || Decision || 5 || 3:00
|-  style="background:#fbb;"
| 1992-04-24|| Loss ||align=left| Nuathroanee Thongracha || Lumpinee Stadium || Bangkok, Thailand || Decision || 5 || 3:00
|- style="background:#cfc;"
| 1992-03-10 || Win ||align=left| Namkabuan Nongkeepahuyuth || Lumpinee Stadium || Bangkok, Thailand  || Decision || 5 || 3:00
|- style="background:#cfc;"
| 1992-01-31 || Win ||align=left| Wangchannoi Sor Palangchai || Lumpinee Stadium ||  Bangkok, Thailand  || Decision || 5 || 3:00
|-
! style=background:white colspan=9 |
|-  style="background:#cfc;"
| 1991-12-27|| Win ||align=left| Superlek Sorn E-Sarn || Lumpinee Stadium || Bangkok, Thailand || Decision || 5 || 3:00
|-  style="background:#cfc;"
| 1991-11-26|| Win ||align=left| Tanooin Chor Chuchat || Lumpinee Stadium || Bangkok, Thailand || Decision || 5 || 3:00
|-  style="background:#fbb;"
| 1991-10-25|| Loss ||align=left| Cherry Sor Wanich || Lumpinee Stadium || Bangkok, Thailand || Decision || 5 || 3:00
|-  style="background:#cfc;"
| 1991-09-24|| Win||align=left| Dokmaipa Por Pongsawang || Lumpinee Stadium || Bangkok, Thailand || Decision || 5 || 3:00
|-  style="background:#c5d2ea;"
| 1991-09-03|| Draw ||align=left| Jongsanan Fairtex || Lumpinee Stadium || Bangkok, Thailand || Decision || 5 || 3:00
|-  style="background:#fbb;"
| 1991-07-30|| Loss||align=left| Jirasak Keatsamanwit || Lumpinee Stadium || Bangkok, Thailand || Decision || 5 || 3:00
|-  style="background:#cfc;"
| 1991-06-28|| Win ||align=left| Samranthong Kiatbanchong || Lumpinee Stadium || Bangkok, Thailand || Decision || 5 || 3:00
|-  style="background:#fbb;"
| 1991-06-11|| Loss||align=left| Pimaranlek Sitaran || Lumpinee Stadium || Bangkok, Thailand || Decision || 5 || 3:00
|-  style="background:#c5d2ea;"
| 1991-05-17|| Draw||align=left| Pimaranlek Sitaran || Lumpinee Stadium || Bangkok, Thailand || Decision || 5 || 3:00
|-  style="background:#cfc;"
| 1991-04-07|| Win||align=left| Wanghin Por Chaiwat || Central Boxing Stadium || Samut Songkhram, Thailand || Decision || 5 || 3:00
|-  style="background:#cfc;"
| 1991-03-22|| Win ||align=left| Samranthong Kiatbanchong || Lumpinee Stadium || Bangkok, Thailand || Decision || 5 || 3:00
|-  style="background:#fbb;"
| 1991-01-20|| Loss||align=left| Panomrung Sit Sor Wor Por|| Pantip Plaza Boxing Stadium || Bangkok, Thailand || Decision || 5 || 3:00
|- style="background:#cfc;"
| 1990-12-26 || Win||align=left| Grandprixnoi Muangchaiyaphum || Lumpinee Stadium ||  Bangkok, Thailand  || Decision || 5 || 3:00
|- style="background:#cfc;"
| 1990-11-27 || Win||align=left| Karuhat Sor.Supawan || Lumpinee Stadium ||  Bangkok, Thailand  || Decision || 5 || 3:00
|-  style="background:#fbb;"
| 1990-10-26|| Loss ||align=left| Pimaranlek Sitaran || Lumpinee Stadium || Bangkok, Thailand || Decision || 5 || 3:00
|-  style="background:#cfc;"
| 1990-09-19|| Win||align=left| Boonam Chor Waikul || Rajadamnern Stadium || Bangkok, Thailand || Decision || 5 || 3:00
|-  style="background:#cfc;"
| 1990-08-07|| Win||align=left| Pimaranlek Sitaran || Lumpinee Stadium || Bangkok, Thailand || Decision || 5 || 3:00
|- style="background:#fbb;"
| 1990-06-08 || Loss||align=left| Oley Kiatoneway || Lumpinee Stadium ||  Bangkok, Thailand  || Decision || 5 || 3:00 
|-
! style=background:white colspan=9 |
|- style="background:#fbb;"
| 1990-05-15|| Loss||align=left| Dokmaipa Por Pongsawang || Lumpinee Stadium ||  Bangkok, Thailand  || Decision || 5 || 3:00
|-  style="background:#cfc;"
| 1990-04-24|| Win||align=left| Oley Kiatoneway || OneSongchai, Lumpinee Stadium || Bangkok, Thailand || Decision || 5 || 3:00  
|-
! style=background:white colspan=9 |
|-  style="background:#fbb;"
| 1990-03-02|| Loss||align=left| Kangwannoi Or Seebualoi || Lumpinee Stadium || Bangkok, Thailand || Decision || 5 || 3:00
|-  style="background:#cfc;"
| 1990-02-06|| Win||align=left| Kangwannoi Or Seebualoi || Lumpinee Stadium || Bangkok, Thailand || Decision || 5 || 3:00
|-  style="background:#cfc;"
| 1990-01-19|| Win||align=left| Langsuan Panyuthaphum || Lumpinee Stadium || Bangkok, Thailand || Decision || 5 || 3:00
|-
! style=background:white colspan=9 |
|- style="background:#c5d2ea;"
| 1989-12-08 || Draw||align=left| Grandprixnnoi Muangchaiyapoom ||  Lumpinee Stadium ||  Bangkok, Thailand  || Decision || 5 || 3:00
|- style="background:#cfc;"
| 1989-11-07 || Win||align=left| Noppadet Sor Rewadee ||  Lumpinee Stadium ||  Bangkok, Thailand  || Decision || 5 || 3:00
|-  style="background:#cfc;"
| 1989-10-20|| Win||align=left| Panphet Muangsurin || Rajadamnern Stadium || Bangkok, Thailand || Decision || 5 || 3:00
|- style="background:#cfc;"
| 1989-08-28 || Win||align=left| Karuhat Sor.Supawan ||  Lumpinee Stadium ||  Bangkok, Thailand  || Decision || 5 || 3:00
|- style="background:#cfc;"
| 1989-07-25 || Win||align=left| Seesot Sahakanohsot ||  Lumpinee Stadium ||  Bangkok, Thailand  || Decision || 5 || 3:00
|-  style="background:#cfc;"
| 1988-|| Win||align=left| Daoden Sor.Sukkasem || Rajadamnern Stadium || Bangkok, Thailand || Decision || 5 || 3:00
|-
| colspan=9 | Legend:

References

1973 births
Living people
Boonlai Sor.Thanikul
Boonlai Sor.Thanikul
Boonlai Sor.Thanikul
Boonlai Sor.Thanikul